Juliana Cerqueira Leite (born 1981) is a Brazilian sculptor based in New York, known for creating large-scale works that explores the physical presence of the human body. She is considered to push the boundaries of sculpture.

Life and education 
Leite (pronounced: ˈleɪt͡ʃˌɘ) was born and grew up in Brazil and studied sculpture in the United Kingdom at Chelsea College of Arts, graduating with an MFA in sculpture from the Slade School of Fine Art in London. She then undertook an MA in Drawing at Camberwell College of Art.

Artwork 
Leite's artwork often combines performance and sculpture. The sculptural materials she uses are wide-ranging and include: hydrocal, FGR-95, plaster, glass fibre, steel, and pigment. To create her artworks, Leite often makes casts from clay, using her own body and movement to develop forms. Leite has also produced site specific and video installation works.

Leite has been inspired by ancient cultures and events, including excavations at Pompeii. Earlier work explored Amazonian funerary urns.

Until Different, Leite's first solo exhibition in New York, was held at Arsenal Contemporary, Bowery in 2018.

Exhibitions 
Notable exhibitions include:

Vancouver Biennale, Vancouver, Canada (2014 Residency)
Antarctica, Antarctic Pavilion, 57th Venice Biennale of Art, Venice, Italy, 2017
Until Different, London, UK (2018) 
Sculpture in the City - London, UK (2018)
Orogenesis - Naples, Italy (2019)

Awards 

 The Kenneth Armitage Young Sculptor Prize, 2006
A.I.R. Gallery Fellowship, 2010-2011
Furla Art Prize, 5th Moscow International Young Art Biennial, 2016
 Pollock Krasner Foundation Grant, April 2019

See also 
 Do It Again (EP)
 Arts in Marrakech (AiM) International Biennale

References

External links 
CASS Sculpture Foundation
Art Viewer - non-profit organisation and an artist initiative based in Antwerp, Belgium
Fine Art Globe (New York)
Sculpture Space residency organisation (USA)
Galería NoguerasBlanchard: Juliana Cerqueira Leite

21st-century Brazilian women artists
21st-century Brazilian artists
Brazilian women sculptors
1981 births
Living people